Yves Victor Sarault (born December 23, 1972) is a Canadian former professional ice hockey player and coach. He played 106 games in the National Hockey League for the Montreal Canadiens, Calgary Flames, Colorado Avalanche, Ottawa Senators, Atlanta Thrashers and the Nashville Predators between 1995 and 2001. He is currently serving as the Head Coach of the SCL Tigers in the National League (NL).

Playing career
As a youth, Sarault played in the 1985 Quebec International Pee-Wee Hockey Tournament with a minor ice hockey team from Salaberry-de-Valleyfield.

Sarault was drafted 61st overall by the Canadiens in the 1991 NHL Entry Draft. From July 18, 2008, he played for German team ERC Ingolstadt in DEL after previous spells with EHC Basel, SC Bern, Genève-Servette HC and HC Davos in the Swiss NLA league from 2002 to 2008. Sarault has also participated for Team Canada in the Spengler Cup.

After initially starting the 2009–10 season with lower professional league team Rivière-du-Loup CIMT in the LNAH, Sarault left for Europe on December 16, 2009, signing for the remainder of the season with Vienna Capitals of the Austrian Erste Bank Hockey League. After returning to Rivière-du-Loup for a further two seasons, Sarault was traded at the draft to  fellow club the Cornwall River Kings for the 2012–13 season on June 17, 2012.

In the off-season Sarault lives in Moncton, New Brunswick and plays occasionally with the Moncton Puck Wackers hockey club in the city's summer men's league, with his son Chris.

Coaching career 
He joined the staff of Swiss club Lausanne HC as an assistant in 2014 and was promoted to the head coaching position during the 2017-18 season after the sacking of Dan Ratushny. On February 8, 2018, Sarault was relieved of his duties after five straight losses.

On January 22, 2021, Sarault was named head coach of EHC Visp in the Swiss League (SL). He led the team to the playoffs but were swept in the quarterfinals by future SL champion, HC Ajoie. Sarault was not renewed as head coach following the 2020–21 season.

Sarault working as a hockey analyst for the National League's official broadcaster, MySports, before returning to the coaching ranks in accepting the head coaching role with SCL Tigers of the NL on January 16, 2022.

Personal life 
His daughter Courtney Sarault is a short track speed skater and has represented Canada at the 2022 Winter Olympics.

Career statistics

Regular season and playoffs

References

External links
 

1972 births
Living people
Atlanta Thrashers players
Calgary Flames players
Canadian expatriate ice hockey players in Austria
Canadian expatriate ice hockey players in Switzerland
Canadian ice hockey left wingers
Colorado Avalanche players
Detroit Vipers players
EHC Basel players
EHC Olten players
ERC Ingolstadt players
Fredericton Canadiens players
French Quebecers
Genève-Servette HC players
Grand Rapids Griffins (IHL) players
HC Davos players
Hershey Bears players
Ice hockey people from Quebec
Montreal Canadiens draft picks
Montreal Canadiens players
Nashville Predators players
Orlando Solar Bears (IHL) players
Ottawa Senators players
Philadelphia Phantoms players
Saint-Jean Lynx players
Saint John Flames players
SC Bern players
SC Langenthal players
SCL Tigers players
Sportspeople from Salaberry-de-Valleyfield
Springfield Falcons players
Trois-Rivières Draveurs players
Victoriaville Tigres players
Vienna Capitals players
Wheeling Thunderbirds players